Dino Waldren (born July 11, 1991) is an American rugby union player who plays the prop position for NOLA Gold in Major League Rugby (MLR). He also plays for the United States national rugby union team.

He previously played for the London Scottish professional team in the English second division, the RFU Championship.

Career
Waldren is from Crockett, California, in the San Francisco Bay Area. He attended De La Salle high school. He played college rugby with the Saint Mary's Gaels in California, and was named as an All-American in 2015 and again in 2016. During autumn 2016, Waldren played for Blackrock College in Dublin, in Division 2A of the All-Ireland League.
Waldren signed with the London Scottish in August 2017 for the 2017–18 season.

U.S. national team
Waldren debuted for the U.S. national team during the November 2016 tests under head coach John Mitchell, coming on as a substitute against Romania. Waldren also featured for the U.S. during 2017, playing in both the 2017 Americas Rugby Championship and the June international tests.

References

American rugby union players
Living people
San Diego Legion players
1991 births
United States international rugby union players
Rugby union props
London Scottish F.C. players
New Orleans Gold players
De La Salle High School (Concord, California) alumni